Ulchsky District is an administrative and municipal district (raion), one of the seventeen in Khabarovsk Krai, Russia. It is located in the east of the krai and named after the indigenous Ulch people. Its administrative center is the rural locality (a selo) of Bogorodskoye. Population:  The population of Bogorodskoye accounts for 20.8% of the district's total population.

History
A number of interesting Yuan and Ming Dynasty archaeological monuments have been found on the Tyr Cliff near the village of Tyr in this district.

Demographics
Over 90% of the Russian population of Ulch people live in Ulchsky District.

References

Notes

Sources

Districts of Khabarovsk Krai